Grammodes cooma is a moth of the family Noctuidae first described by Charles Swinhoe in 1900. It is known from the Australian state of Queensland and the Indonesia's Ambon Island.

The wingspan is about 40 mm.

References

External links

Ophiusina
Moths described in 1900